The canton of Le Sud-Gironde is an administrative division of the Gironde department, southwestern France. It was created at the French canton reorganisation which came into effect in March 2015. Its seat is in Langon.

It consists of the following communes:
 
Aubiac
Bazas
Bernos-Beaulac
Bieujac
Birac
Bommes
Bourideys
Captieux
Castets et Castillon
Cauvignac
Cazalis
Cazats
Cours-les-Bains
Cudos
Escaudes
Fargues
Gajac
Gans
Giscos
Goualade
Grignols
Labescau
Langon
Lartigue
Lavazan
Léogeats
Lerm-et-Musset
Lignan-de-Bazas
Lucmau
Marimbault
Marions
Masseilles
Mazères
Le Nizan
Noaillan
Pompéjac
Préchac
Roaillan
Saint-Côme
Saint-Loubert
Saint-Michel-de-Castelnau
Saint-Pardon-de-Conques
Saint-Pierre-de-Mons
Sauternes
Sauviac
Sendets
Sillas
Toulenne
Uzeste
Villandraut

References

Cantons of Gironde